The August 1 Medal, also known as the Order of Bayi, is a military decoration of People's Republic of China awarded by the Chairman of the Central Military Commission, and is the highest military award given to military personnel and civilians of the People's Liberation Army, People's Armed Police and personnel of Ministry of Public Security.

History 
The August 1 Medal was originally established in 1955 as the highest military award for members of the PLA who served during the Chinese Civil War. On June 12, 2017, with the approval of Xi Jinping, Chairman of the Central Military Commission, the Order of August the First was re-established.

Recipients 
2017
On 28 July 2017, Xi Jinping awarded the decoration to ten recipients:
 Mai Xiande (麦贤得)
 Ma Weiming (马伟明), led the development of China's electromagnetic catapult system for launching aircraft from carriers
 Li Zhonghua (李中华)
 Wang Zhongxin (王忠心)
 Jing Haipeng (景海鹏), first Chinese astronaut to fly in space more than once
 Cheng Kaijia (程开甲), nuclear engineer and key figure in Chinese nuclear weapon development
 Wei Changjin (韦昌进)
 Wang Gang (王刚)
 Leng Pengfei (冷鹏飞)
 Yin Chunrong (印春荣)

2022
On 27 July 2022, Xi Jinping signs order to confer Medal on three military individuals:
 Du Fuguo (杜富国), sergeant in the PLA Southern Theater Command
 Qian Qihu (钱七虎), retired researcher at the former PLA University of Science and Technology
 Nie Haisheng (聂海胜), renowned astronaut from the PLA Astronaut Division

References 

2017 establishments in China
Military awards and decorations of the People's Liberation Army
Awards established in 2017